Yashlatz (acronym for  Yeshivat Yerushalayim L’Tzeirim, "Jerusalem Yeshiva for Youth") is a religious Zionist yeshiva high school in Jerusalem. It was founded in 1964 by a student of the ultranationalist Orthodox rabbi Tzvi Yehuda HaCohen Kook to teach teenage boys in the Mercaz Harav community.

Faculty 
The former Rosh Yeshiva is Rabbi Yerachamiel Weiss and right now the Rosh Yeshiva is Rabbi Yair Gizbar . Notable National Religious rabbis teach, and have taught in Yashlatz in the past. Among them are Rabbi David Samson and Rabbi Haim Steiner.

Terrorist attack 

On March 6, 2008, a terrorist opened fire at the Yeshivat Mercaz Harav, adjacent to  Yashlatz. Five Yashlatz students were murdered in the school library, along with 3 students from the Yeshivat Mercaz Harav.

Notable alumni 
Famous graduates include Rabbi Yaakov Shapira (current Head of Mercaz HaRav Yeshiva), Rabbi Mordechai Elon (former Head of Yeshivat HaKotel and leader of the MiBreshit movement), Rabbi Eliezer Melamed, Rabbi Shmuel Eliyahu (chief rabbi of Tzfat) and Colonel Dror Weinberg, (Yehuda Brigade Commander in the IDF), who was killed in an ambush in Hebron in 2002.

References

External links 
 

Mesivtas
Orthodox yeshivas in Jerusalem
Religious Zionist yeshivot